The following is a list of notable events and releases that happened in 2018 in music in South Korea.

Notable achievements and events 

 January 10–11 – IU and BTS win the digital and album daesangs, respectively, at the 32nd Golden Disc Awards.
 February 25 – CL and Exo headline the 2018 Winter Olympics closing ceremony at the Pyeongchang Olympic Stadium, serving as representatives of K-pop at the event.
 February 28 – At the annual Korean Music Awards, BTS, Kang Tae-gu, and Hyukoh win the grand prizes.
 April 1 and 3 – The Spring is Coming Korean cultural diplomacy concert takes place in Pyongyang, North Korea, which featured performances from various South Korean musicians including Cho Yong-pil, Red Velvet, Lee Sun-hee, Baek Ji-young, and Seohyun.
 April 20 – The Korea Music Content Association launches new certification system for albums, downloads, and streaming in South Korea.
 May 27 – Love Yourself: Tear by BTS becomes the first K-pop album to top the Billboard 200, as well as the highest charting album by any Asian act.
 May 28 – Twice's "Wake Me Up" becomes the first single by a foreign female artist to be certified double platinum by the Recording Industry Association of Japan (RIAJ).
 May 29 – BTS's "Fake Love" becomes the first K-pop song to enter the top-ten on the Billboard Hot 100, and the 17th non-English song to do so in the chart's history.
 June 16 – "Ddu-Du Ddu-Du" by Blackpink records 36.2 million views on YouTube video within 24 hours, setting a new record by a Korean act.
 June 25 – Blackpink's "Ddu-Du Ddu-Du" and Square Up simultaneously become the highest-charting song and album by a K-pop girl group in the US at the time.
 October 24 – The 9th government-run Korean Popular Culture and Arts Awards take place. Kim Min-ki, Jo Dong-jin, Gim Jeong-taek, and BTS are awarded with the Order of Cultural Merit; BTS were the youngest recipients of the honor in South Korean history. Yoon Sang is awarded with the Presidential Commendation and Kang San-ae and Choi Jin-hee receive the Prime Mister's Commendation.
 November 5 – Twice become the fastest K-pop girl group to reach 20 million views on YouTube with "Yes or Yes", doing so in 10 hours and 27 minutes.
 November 9 – "Mic Drop" (Steve Aoki remix) is certified platinum by the RIAA, making BTS the first Korean group with a platinum-certified single in the US.
 November 12 – Exo becomes the first group to surpass 10 million total album sales in South Korea.
 December 1 – At the annual Melon Music Awards, iKon and BTS win the grand prizes.
 December 10, 12, 14 – The 2018 Mnet Asian Music Awards are held in South Korea, Japan, Hong Kong over the course of a week. BTS and Twice receive the grand prizes at the ceremony.
 According to Forbes, "the South Korean music market experienced a 17.9% increase in revenue growth in 2018, and it was described as 'shifting from 'potential' to 'power' player'" on the global stage.

Award shows and festivals

Award ceremonies

Festivals

Debuting and disbanding in 2018

Debuting groups

 Ateez
 D-Crunch
 DreamNote
 Fanatics - Flavor
 Forestella
 Fromis 9
 (G)I-dle
 Girlkind
 Gugudan SeMiNa
 GWSN
 Honey Popcorn
 Iz*One
 JBJ95
 Loona
 Maywish
 Nature
 NeonPunch
 Noir
 NTB
 Oh!GG
 Pristin V
 Saturday
 Spectrum
 Stray Kids
 Target
 UNB
 Uni.T
 W24
 We Girls
 WJMK

Solo debuts

 Ash Island
 Elkie
 Haon
 Ha Hyun-woo
 Holland
 Hoya
 Hynn
 Jennie
 J-Hope
 Jin Longguo
 Jung Il-hoon
 Katie
 Key
 Kim Dong-han
 Lee Chang-sub
 Leo
 Mino
 Moonbyul
 Onew
 Sohee
 Sori
 Son Dong-woon
 Sooyoung
 twlv
 Vinxen
 Wheein
 Yoo Seon-ho
 Youra
 Yubin
 Yuju
 Yuri

Disbandments

 Drunken Tiger
 Fiestar
 Homme
 JBJ
 Kiha & The Faces
 Melody Day
 Mr.Mr
 NU'EST W
 Rainz
 Secret
 SSAW
 Stellar
 Tahiti
 The East Light
 Triple H
 Trouble Maker
 Uni.T

Releases in 2018

First quarter

January

February

March

Second quarter

April

May

June

Third quarter

July

August

September

Fourth quarter

October

November

December

Deaths

Maeng Yu-na (aged 29), singer
Seo Min-woo (aged 33), singer (100%)

See also

2018 in South Korea
List of South Korean films of 2018
List of Gaon Album Chart number ones of 2018
List of Gaon Digital Chart number ones of 2018

Notes

References

 
South Korean music
K-pop